In chemistry, methanetetracarboxylate is a tetravalent anion with formula  or  C(COO−)4.  It has four carboxylate groups attached to a central carbon atom; so it has the same carbon backbone as neopentane. It is an oxocarbon anion, that is, consists only of carbon and oxygen.

The term is also used for any salt  with that anion; or for any ester with the C(COO)4 moiety.

The salts and esters are relatively uncommon, and their uses appear to be limited to chemical research.   The sodium salt Na4C(COO)4 can be obtained by oxidation of pentaerythritol C(CH2OH)4 with oxygen in sodium hydroxide solution at pH 10 and about 60 °C, in the presence of palladium as a catalyst.

The anion can be seen as the result of removing four protons from methanetetracarboxylic acid, a  hypothetical organic compound with formula C5H4O8 or C(COOH)4.  This acid has not been synthesised (as of 2009), and is believed to be unstable, but its tetraethyl ester, C(COOCH2CH3)4, is a specialty chemical and has been used in organic synthesis.

References

Carboxylate anions
Oxocarbons